, is a Japanese manga series written and illustrated by Yarō Abe. It was serialized in Shogakukan's seinen manga magazine Big Comic Original Zōkan from October 2006 to August 2007, before being transferred to Big Comic Original in August 2007. Its chapters have been collected in 25 wide-ban volumes as of August 2022. It is about a late-night diner, open from midnight to dawn, and its eccentric patrons.

It was adapted into a Japanese television drama, directed by Joji Matsuoka and starring Kaoru Kobayashi as the Master, and ran for three season from 2009 to 2014. A live-action film premiered in 2015. Netflix Japan produced a fourth season and a second live-action film in 2016, and a fifth season in 2019. The series was also adapted into a Korean television series, titled Late Night Restaurant, in 2015, and a Chinese television series in 2017.

As of October 2014, the manga had over 2.3 million copies in circulation. In 2010, it won the 55th Shogakukan Manga Award in the General category and the 39th Japan Cartoonist Award.

Media

Manga
It was later transferred to Big Comic Original on August 20, 2007. Shogakukan has collected its chapters into individual wide-ban volumes. The first volume was published on December 26, 2007. As of August 30, 2022, twenty-five volumes have been published.

Volume list

Drama

Japanese television drama

A Japanese television drama was announced in August 2009, starring Kaoru Kobayashi as the Master. The series' first season ran for 10 episodes from October to December 2009 on MBS, TBS and other networks. A second season ran for 10 episodes from October to December 2011. A third season ran for 10 episodes from October to December 2014. A live-action film also premiered on January 31, 2015. In May 2016, Netflix announced that a 10-episode fourth season would premiere worldwide on October 21 of the same year. They also announced a second live-action film that premiered on November 5 of the same year. A 10-episode fifth season premiered on Netflix on October 31, 2019.

Korean television drama

A Korean television drama, titled Late Night Restaurant, was broadcast in 2015.

Chinese television drama

A Chinese television drama was broadcast in 2017.

Chinese film
A Chinese film adaptation, unrelated to the Chinese television series, was directed by Tony Leung Ka-fai and released in 2019.

Reception
As of October 2014, the manga had over 2.3 million copies in circulation. The series ranked #5 on Takarajimasha's Kono Manga ga Sugoi! list of best manga of 2009 for male readers. In 2009, the manga was nominated for the 2nd Manga Taishō. In 2010, it won the 55th Shogakukan Manga Award in the General category. The same year, the manga won the 39th Japan Cartoonist Award. The manga was nominated for the Best Comic award at the Angoulême International Comics Festival in 2018 and 2019.

Notes

References

External links
  
 

2006 manga
2009 Japanese television series debuts
2009 Japanese television series endings
Cooking in anime and manga
Films with screenplays by Haruhiko Arai
Japanese television dramas based on manga
Seinen manga
Shogakukan manga
Winners of the Shogakukan Manga Award for general manga